The Italian Athletics Championships are the national championships in athletics, organised every year by the Federazione Italiana di Atletica Leggera.

The first edition, four races only, was held in 1906 at Arena Civica in Milan, just after the foundation of the Federazione Podistica Italiana and with the organization of La Gazzetta dello Sport.

Since then, 110 editions were held with the only exceptions of the years 1915-1918 and 1944. During  1945, only athletes of Northern Italy could participate but FIDAL considered this edition as an official one.

To the running races, in 1913 the field events were added.

Some facts have to be underlined:
 in 1920, track events were disputed in Rome and field events in Milan;
 in 1922, 2 towns hosted the championships, Milan and Busto Arsizio;
 in 1931, 3 sessions were held in Bologna, Rome and Milan;
 in 1932, 2 towns hosted the events: Pisa and Milan; 
 the first male and female championships were held together in 1953 (always separated before that year);
 in 1974, for preparing the 1974 European Championships in Rome, it was implemented for the first time automatic timing but the Federation decided to diminish the time of 16/100th the first day and of 18/100th on the following 2 days; The Italian Championships held in 2010 in Grosseto were the 100th edition (not held just five times: 1915, 1916, 1917, 1918 and 1944 in 105 years from 1906 to 2010).

Editions
Shows only the main venue of the events (usually marathon, race walk, 10000 metres and combined events were held in different venues). In 2013 the Championships backs in Arena Civica in Milan.

The number of editions refers to the male ones, the female ones are 19 less. The first women's edition was disputed in 1923 and until 1952 the men's and women's championships disputed the two different venues. Only from the 1953 edition the championships were disputed in a single venue.

Championship records

Men

Women

Multi winners

Updated to 2021 Italian Athletics Indoor Championships (February 2021).

Men
Angiolo Profeti (shot put) and Adolfo Consolini (discus throw), with their 15 outdoor titles, are those who have won the highest number in a single specialty.

Women
Agnese Maffeis (38) and Marisa Masullo (30) are the Italian women multi winners.

Italian Winter Throwing Championships
The Italian Winter Throwing Championships (Campionati italiani invernali di lanci), are the Italian championships of three of the throwing events in athletics (the discus throw, hammer throw, and javelin throw), which, for logistical reasons, do not have an indoor championship. The fourth throwing event in track and field, shot put, is included in the Italian Athletics Indoor Championships instead.

The championships are organized by FIDAL (Italian Athletics Federation) since 1984. The 2022 edition was held in Mariano Comense. Focus was upon Sara Fantini, female hammer thrower, who had recently thrown 72.61 meters, close to the Italian women's national record of 73.59 meters (achieved by Ester Balassini in 2005). She did win, but with a best throw of 68.18 meters.

Winter is not the only period of competitive throwing in Italy, at least not when international competitions are held in the nation.  Notably, at the 2007 IAAF Golden League in Rome, French high jumper Salim Sdiri was hit by a javelin.  In 2010, IAAF's Golden League was replaced by World Athletics' Diamond League, which provides perhaps the highest level of competition in outdoor track and field.  The Diamond League's annual Golden Gala, which includes all four throwing events, has been held every year from 2010 to 2022 at the Stadio Olimpico in Rome, with exception that in 2021 it was held in Florence.

Venues

Winners

Men
In bold the record of Championships

Women
In bold the record of Championships

See also
 List of Italian Athletics Championships winners
 Italian Athletics Indoor Championships
 Italian Cross Country Championships
 Italian Athletics Clubs Championships
 FIDAL (italian governing bodies for athletics)
 Athletics in Italy
 Italy national athletics team
 Italian records in athletics
 :Category:National athletics champions

References

External links
 CAMPIONATI “ASSOLUTI” – UOMINI TUTTI I CAMPIONI – 1906-2016
 CAMPIONATI “ASSOLUTI” – DONNE TUTTE LE CAMPIONESSE – 1923-2016
 Italian Athletics Championships from 1960 to 2006

 

Athletics competitions in Italy
Recurring sporting events established in 1906
 
National athletics competitions
Outdoor
1906 establishments in Italy